827 Naval Air Squadron was an aircraft squadron of the Royal Navy's Fleet Air Arm during the Second World War.

It operated Fairey Barracudas starting in May 1943, becoming the first squadron to receive the Fairey Barracuda in any substantial number, and was led by Strike leader Roy Sydney Baker-Falkner in the attack on the German battleship Tirpitz in Operation Tungsten in 3 April 1944. Post-war it initially operated the Blackburn Firebrand strike fighter, until 1954 when the squadron began operating Westland Wyverns.

References

800 series Fleet Air Arm squadrons